Denis Milan Špoljarić (born 20 August 1979) is a Croatian former handball player who currently works as an assistant coach of RK Zagreb. He was a World champion in 2003 with the Croatian national team, and Olympic champion in 2004. He received a silver medal at the 2005 World Championship and a silver medal at the 2008 European Championship.

Honours
Zagreb
Premier League 
Winner (11): 1997–98, 1998–99, 1999–00, 2000–01, 2002–03, 2003–04, 2004–05, 2005–06, 2007–08, 2008–09, 2009–10
Croatian Cup
Winner (10): 1998, 1999, 2000, 2001, 2003, 2004, 2005, 2006, 2008, 2009, 2010
EHF Cup Winners' Cup
Finalist (1): 2005

Pfadi Winterthur
Swiss League
Winner (1): 2001-02

Pivovara Laško Celje
MIK 1. Liga
Winner (1): 2006-07
Slovenian Cup
Winner (1): 2007
EHF Men's Champions Trophy
Finalist (1): 2007

Füchse Berlin Reinickendorf.
DHB-Pokal
Winner (1): 2014
EHF Cup
Winner (1): 2015
IHF Super Globe
Winner (1): 2015

Individual
Franjo Bučar State Award for Sport - 2004

Orders
Order of Danica Hrvatska with face of Franjo Bučar - 2004

References

1979 births
Living people
Croatian male handball players
Croatian expatriate sportspeople in Switzerland
Croatian expatriate sportspeople in Slovenia
Croatian expatriate sportspeople in Germany
Olympic handball players of Croatia
Handball players at the 2004 Summer Olympics
Olympic gold medalists for Croatia
RK Zagreb players
Olympic medalists in handball
Medalists at the 2004 Summer Olympics